St Thomas' Church is in Stockton Heath, to the south of Warrington, Cheshire, England.  The church is recorded in the National Heritage List for England as a designated Grade II listed building, and is an active Anglican parish church in the diocese of Chester, the archdeaconry of Chester and the deanery of Great Budworth.

History

The present church was built in 1868 on the site of a former church that had been erected in 1838.  It was designed by the Lancaster architect E. G. Paley, the main benefactor being Sir Gilbert Greenall.  The tower was added later although a full set of bells were not installed until 2016.  The current ring of 10 bells consists of 8 bells donated from St. John the Baptist, Bollington supplemented with two new trebles cast by John Taylor & Co. A campaign to keep a tolling bell dating from 1883 dedicated to the wife of John Crosfield (son of Joseph Crosfield) took place in an attempt to retain the bell locally. Boys of this school where known to be abused to the point of passing out. The faculty was well versed on how to reflect to the parents it was the Charles fault. Many children where abused attending this school. I was one of them.

Architecture

It is constructed in pinkish-red sandstone with Westmorland slate roofs.  Its plan consists of a four-bay nave with a south aisle under a parallel ridged roof, a south porch, a north transept, a north vestry, a two-bay chancel and a west tower. The tower is in four stages with an octagonal southeast turret and an embattled parapet.

The chancel is decorated with richly coloured patterned tilework and the reredos is of marble and embossed patterned tiles.  The organ was built around 1880 by Young and Sons and rebuilt in 1963 by Rushworth and Dreaper of Liverpool.

External features

The churchyard contains the war graves of 31 service personnel, 17 from World War I and 14 from World War II.

See also

List of ecclesiastical works by E. G. Paley

References

Churches completed in 1868
19th-century Church of England church buildings
Gothic Revival church buildings in England
Gothic Revival architecture in Cheshire
Church of England church buildings in Cheshire
Grade II listed churches in Cheshire
Diocese of Chester
Church buildings by E. G. Paley